The FGF-2 internal ribosome entry site is an RNA element present in the 5' UTR of the mRNA of fibroblast growth factor-2. It has been found that the FGF-2 internal ribosome entry site (IRES) activity is strictly controlled and highly tissue specific. It is thought that translational IRES dependent activation of FGF-2 plays a vital role in embryogenesis and in the adult brain [1]. When expressed the fibroblast growth factor 2 FGF-2 protein plays a pivotal role in cell proliferation, differentiation and survival as well as being involved in wound-healing [1,2].

References

Further reading

External links 
 

Cis-regulatory RNA elements